Vento v Chief Constable of West Yorkshire Police [2002] EWCA Civ 1871 is a UK labour law case, concerning the measure of damages for discrimination under the Equality Act 2010. It set out a three band scale of damages, known as the Vento bands, which are updated each year for inflation.

Facts

Judgment
The Court of Appeal of England and Wales held that damages should be reduced, in order to make the scale consistent with awards in other fields of law.

See also

UK labor law

Notes
 For cases begun on or after 6 April 2021, the uprated Vento Bands  for injury to feelings awards are,

   lower band  £900 to £9,100;

   middle band £9,100 to £27,400;and

   higher band £27,400 to £45,600.

The bands are usually updated annually on 6 April and the date is relevant to when a claim is presented to a Tribunal.

References

United Kingdom labour case law